Fundamental Interpersonal Relations Orientation (FIRO) is a theory of interpersonal relations, introduced by William Schutz in 1958. This theory mainly explains the interpersonal interactions of a local group of people. The theory is based on the belief that when people get together in a group, there are three main interpersonal needs they are looking to obtain – affection/openness, control and inclusion. Schutz developed a measuring instrument that contains six scales of nine-item questions, and this became version B (for "Behavior"). This technique was created to measure how group members feel when it comes to inclusion, control, and affection/openness or to be able to get feedback from people in a group.

Description
These categories measure how much interaction a person wants in the areas of socializing, leadership and responsibilities, and more intimate personal relations. FIRO-B was created, based on this theory, as a measurement instrument with scales that assess the behavioral aspects of the three dimensions. Scores are graded from 0–9 in scales of expressed and wanted behavior, which define how much a person expresses to others, and how much he wants from others. Schutz believed that FIRO scores in themselves were not terminal, and can and do change, and did not encourage typology; however, the four temperaments were eventually mapped to the scales of the scoring system, which led to the creation of a theory of five temperaments.

Schutz himself discussed the impact of extreme behavior in the areas of inclusion, control, and openness as indicated by scores on the FIRO-B (and the later Element-B). For each area of interpersonal need the following three types of behavior would be evident: (1) deficient, (2) excessive, and (3) ideal. Deficient was defined as indicating that an individual was not trying to directly satisfy the need. Excessive was defined as indicating that an individual was constantly trying to satisfy the need. Ideal referred to satisfaction of the need. From this, he identified the following types:

Schutz composed a "Matrix of Relevant Interpersonal Data", which he called "The Elephant". Each area consisted of a smaller matrix of "act" and "feel" by "Self to Other" (Action), "Other to Self" (Reaction), and "Self to Self".

"Act" and "Feel" divided the rows, which were:
"Desired Interpersonal Relations (Needs)", which denoted "satisfactory  relations" in each area; 
"Ideal Interpersonal Relations" is what would correspond to "moderate" expressed and wanted scores; 
"Anxious Interpersonal Relations" was subdivided into rows of "Too much activity" (covering high expressed scores) and "Too little activity" (covering low expressed scores); both being divided into "Act" and "feel". 
The last row was "Pathological Interpersonal relations", which was divided into "too much" and "too little", yielding: 
"Psychotic (Schizophrenia)" as Too Little/Inclusion; (There was no "Too Much/Inclusion") 
"Obsessive-compulsive" as Too Much/Control and "Psychopath" as Too Little/Control; and 
"Neurotic" as too much and too little Affection.

"Self-to other (action)" corresponded to the expressed dimension, and "Other to self (Reaction)" was the basis for the wanted dimension (though it is phrased in terms of what people do, rather than what we want them to do, which would be similar to the later Element B). 
We thus end up with the six dimensions as follows:

Expressed Inclusion (eI): "I initiate interaction with others" (High: "outstanding"; low "shy")
Wanted Inclusion (wI): "I want to be Included" (High: "friendly"; low: "aloof")
expressed Control (eC): "I try to control others" (High: "authoritarian"; low: "absent-minded")
Wanted Control (wC): "I want to be controlled" (High: "submissive"; low: "rebellious")
Expressed Affection (eA): "I try to be close and personal" (High: "empathetic"; low: "cold")
Wanted Affection (wA): "I want others to be close and personal with me" (High: "needy"; low: "defensive")

Putting them together, Schutz came up with fifteen "Descriptive Schema and appropriate terminology for each Interpersonal Need Area":

In 1977, a clinical psychologist who worked with FIRO-B, Dr. Leo Ryan, produced maps of the scores for each area, called "locator charts", and assigned names for all of the score ranges in his Clinical Interpretation of The FIRO-B:

    
However, to continue not to encourage typology, the names (which were for clinical interpretation primarily) are generally not used, and Element-B test results usually total the E, W, I, C and O scores individually. In the derivative "five temperament" system, the different scores are grouped into their corresponding temperaments, and considered inborn types. One key difference is in the "high wanted" scores in the area of Control. A distinction is made between men and women, with men being "dependent", and women, rather than really being dependent, only being "tolerant" of control by others. This is attributed to "the stereotypical role of women in Western Culture", where they were often dependent, and have simply learned to tolerate control from others. This again, reflects FIRO's belief that these scores reflect learned behavior. In five temperament theory, no such distinction between the sexes is recognized, and high wanted scores in Control are seen as an inborn dependency need in both sexes.

Compatibility Theory

Another part of the theory is "compatibility theory", which features the roles of originator, reciprocal, and interchange.

Originator compatibility, involves possible clashes between expressed and wanted behaviors. The example given, is two people with high eC and low wC (aka "Mission Impossible" or "Autocrat Rebellious"). They: 
"will both want to originate the behaviors associated
with the Control needs, and neither will want to
receive those behaviors. Both persons will want to
set the agenda, take responsibility, and direct and
structure the actions of others; neither will feel
comfortable taking direction. The result could be
competition or even conflict."

Reciprocal compatibility is (from another example given from Control), where high eC with low wC interacts with the opposite: low eC with high wC ("Openly Dependent", "Loyal Lieutenant", or "Abdicrat Submissive").

"there is a high degree of reciprocal compatibility because...
one will take charge; the other will be happy to let him or her assume the responsibility."

Interchange compatibility measures how much individuals share the same need strengths.
The example is two people with both high eA and wA ("Optimist" or "Overpersonal Personal-compliant"). They 
"will be compatible because both will see Affection behaviors as
the basis of the relationship, and they will engage
each other around Affection needs." 
(i.e. freely give and receive).

Further development

During the 1970s, Schutz revised and expanded FIRO theory and developed additional instruments for measuring the new aspects of the theory, including Element B: Behavior (an improved version of FIRO-B); Element F: Feelings; Element S: Self; Element W: Work Relations; Element C: Close Relations; Element P: Parental Relationships; and Element O: Organizational Climate.  Since 1984, these instruments have been known collectively as Elements of Awareness.
Element B differs in expanding the definitions of Inclusion, Control, and Affection (renamed "Openness"), into an additional six scores to measure how much a person wants to include, control, and be close to others, and how much other people include, control, and like to be close to the client. "Expressed" is renamed "See" (current behaviors) while "Want" remains desired behaviors. Each of the three areas is split into "Do" (initiating interaction with others) and "Get" (the level received from others). Differences between See and Want scores indicate levels of dissatisfaction.

The original FIRO-B was sold to CPP, Inc. (now The Myers-Briggs Company), which also publishes the MBTI assessment, and FIRO Element B is owned by Business Consultants Network, Inc.

A third FIRO system, called FIRO-Space™ is being developed by Dr. Henry L. Thompson who developed the second one.

Correlations with MBTI
In a 1976 survey of seventy-five of the most widely used training instruments, the FIRO-B was found to be the most generally usable instrument in training. The popularity of the FIRO-B began to wane as the MBTI became one of the instruments of choice in business. Since FIRO-B uses completely different scales from MBTI, and was not designed to measure inborn "types," it is often used together with the MBTI by workplaces.  Now the two are offered together by The Myers-Briggs Company.

Statistical correlation has been observed between FIRO-B and MBTI by John W. Olmstead, and also Allen L. Hammer with Eugene R. Schnell; and between Element B and MBTI by Dr. Henry Dick Thompson.

Citations

References 
 
 
 
  
 
 
 

Human communication
Personality tests